The Krasnoyarsk ship lift is the only ship lift in Russia. Construction began in 1976 at the Krasnoyarsk hydroelectric power station on the Yenisei River. Operation began in 1982. The boat lift consists of the outer harbor, the bottom of the approach channel, the actual lift and turntable. The platform of the lift moves along the rack railway, with the track gauge of 9 m. The movement is carried out by means of electric drive.

In order to load the ship lift, the platform is lowered below the water level, at which point the ship then enters the lift, and the platform begins to move up the overpass. The ships are transported afloat.

At the top of the platform where it meets together with the ship its pulled into the turntable, which moves the lift onto another track, by which the platform is lowered to the upper tail water below the water level. When this is complete, the ship may leave the lift.

Developer of boat lift - Lenhydroproject, manufacturer - Lengidrostal.

Technical features 

 calculated load capacity  - up to 1,500 tons
 useful dimensions of ship-chamber: length - 90 m, width - 18 m, depth - 2.2 m
 overall dimensions of ship-chamber: length - 113 m, width - 26 m, the maximum height - 20 m
 ship-chamber weight: without water - 4 500 tonnes, with the water and the vessel - 8 100 tonnes
 level difference between the upper and lower tail water - 104 m
 length of the "dry" way - 1180 m
 full operational length with underwater sections - 1510 m
 speed - 1 m/s
 rod - 850 tonnes
 gearless drive - motors 1MR16C (68 kW, the moment 29000 Nm, 24 rev/min)
 number of motors and the support wheels - 156
 number of carriages - 78
 limiting the size of the transported vessel - length 80 m, width 17 m, draft 1.86 m
 maximum axle load  - 104 tons per axle
 diameter of the rotator - 106 m, angle of rotation - 140 degrees

See also
 Boat lift
 
 Lock (water navigation)
 List of boat lifts

Notes

References

 Описание Красноярского судоподъёмника на сайте института Ленгидропроект
 Фотографии судоподъёмника в действии
 Фотоотчёт о проходе баржи через судоподъёмник
 Фоторепортаж. Переход рабочих колес через Красноярскую ГЭС // Блог Русгидро
 

Boat lifts
Yenisei River
Krasnoyarsk